HMS Vanity has been the name of more than one ship of the British Royal Navy, and may refer to:

 , a ship in service from 1650 to 1654
 , a V-class destroyer launched in 1918 and scrapped in 1947

Royal Navy ship names